Walter Johannes Damrosch (January 30, 1862December 22, 1950) was a German-born American conductor and composer. He was the director of the New York Symphony Orchestra and conducted the world premiere performances of various works, including Aaron Copland's Symphony for Organ and Orchestra, George Gershwin's Piano Concerto in F and An American in Paris, and Jean Sibelius' Tapiola. Damrosch was also instrumental in the founding of Carnegie Hall. He also conducted the first performance of Rachmaninoff's Piano Concerto No. 3 with the composer himself as soloist.

Life and career

Damrosch was born in Breslau, Silesia, a son of Helene von Heimburg, a former opera singer, and the conductor Leopold Damrosch, and brother of conductor Frank Damrosch and music teacher Clara Mannes. His parents were Lutheran (his paternal grandfather was Jewish).

He exhibited an interest in music at an early age and was instructed by his father in harmony and also studied under Wilhelm Albert Rischbieter and Felix Draeseke at the Dresden Conservatory. He emigrated with his parents in 1871 to the United States.

During the great music festival given by his father in May 1881, he first acted as conductor in drilling several sections of the large chorus, one in New York City, and another in Newark, New Jersey. The latter, consisting chiefly of members of the Harmonic Society, elected him to be their conductor. During this time a series of concerts was given in which such works as Anton Rubinstein's Tower of Babel, Hector Berlioz's La damnation de Faust, and Giuseppe Verdi's Requiem were performed. He was then only 19 years of age, but showed marked ability in drilling large masses.

In 1884, when his father initiated a run of all-German opera at the Metropolitan Opera in New York, Walter was made an assistant conductor. After his father's death in 1885, he held the same post under Anton Seidl and also became conductor of the Oratorio and Symphony Societies in New York.

On May 17, 1890, he married Margaret Blaine (1867–1949), the daughter of American politician and presidential candidate James G. Blaine.
They had four daughters: Alice, Margaret (known as Gretchen), Leopoldine, and Anita.
In 1946 Margaret Gretchen Damrosch Finletter published From the Top of the Stairs,
an autobiography of her childhood growing up with music and meeting many famous people.

Damrosch was best known in his day as a conductor of the music of Richard Wagner, and In 1894 he founded the Damrosch Opera Company for producing Wagner's works. He was also a pioneer in the performance of music on the radio, and as such became one of the chief popularizers of classical music in the United States. He conducted famed solo harpist Vincent Fanelli from 1908 to 1911. At the request of General Pershing he reorganized the bands of the A.E.F. in 1918.

One of his principal achievements was the successful performance of Parsifal, perhaps the most difficult of Wagner's operas, for the first time in the United States, in March 1886, by the Oratorio and Symphony societies. During his visit to Europe in the summer of 1886, he was invited by the Deutsche Tonkünstler-Verein, of which Franz Liszt was president, to conduct some of his father's compositions at Sondershausen, Thuringia. Carl Goldmark's opera Merlin was produced for the first time in the United States under Damrosch's direction, at the Metropolitan Opera House, 3 January 1887.

Although now remembered almost exclusively as a conductor, before his radio broadcasts Damrosch was equally well known as a composer and teacher. His students included Esther Zweig. He composed operas based on stories such as The Scarlet Letter (1896), Cyrano (1913), and The Man Without a Country (1937). Those operas are seldom performed now. He also wrote music for performances of Euripides's Medea and Iphigenia in Tauris, and Sophocles's Electra, and songs such as the intensely dramatic Danny Deever. 
Damrosch was the National Broadcasting Company's music director under David Sarnoff, and from 1928 to 1942, he hosted the network's Music Appreciation Hour, a popular series of radio lectures on classic music aimed at students. (The show was broadcast during school hours, and teachers were provided with textbooks and worksheets by the network.) According to former New York Times critic Harold C. Schonberg in his collection Facing the Music, Damrosch was notorious for making up silly lyrics for the music he discussed in order to "help" young people appreciate it, rather than letting the music speak for itself. An example: for the first movement of Franz Schubert's Unfinished Symphony, the lyric went
This is the symphony,
That Schubert wrote and never finished.

Although Damrosch took an interest in music technologies, he recorded sporadically. His first recording, the prelude to Bizet's Carmen, appeared in 1903 (for Columbia Records, with a contingent of the New York Symphony credited as the "Damrosch Orchestra"). He recorded very few extended works, and those were near the end of his most active time as a conductor; the only symphony he recorded was Brahms's Second followed by Maurice Ravel's Ma mère l'Oye suite with the New York Symphony for Columbia shortly before the orchestra merged with the New York Philharmonic. He also recorded the complete ballet music from the opera Henry VIII by Camille Saint-Saëns, three "Airs de Ballet" from Iphigénie en Aulide by Christoph Willibald Gluck in an arrangement by François-Auguste Gevaert, and shorter works by Johann Sebastian Bach, Gabriel Fauré, and Moritz Moszkowski with the National Broadcasting Company's predecessor of the NBC Symphony Orchestra under the name of the "National Symphony Orchestra" (not to be confused with the later National Symphony Orchestra of Washington, D.C.) for RCA Victor in May and September 1930.

Walter Damrosch died in New York City in 1950. He is interred in Ledgelawn Cemetery in Bar Harbor, Maine.

Damrosch Park at Lincoln Center is named in honor of his family. The public school P186X Walter J. Damrosch School in the Bronx is named after him. A collection of photographs and other items compiled by his daughter Anita is among the Special Collections of the Lovejoy Library at Southern Illinois University Edwardsville.

Criticism by Adorno

Damrosch was the target of Theodor W. Adorno's criticism. Adorno, without always naming Damrosch, wrote during his rather unhappy tenure at the "Princeton Radio Research Project", funded by Sarnoff's RCA, that the Damrosch approach towards popularizing classical music was infantilizing and authoritarian, and part of a broader, if not centrally planned, system of domination.

Adorno showed ways of teaching both children and adults about classical music that would describe its form simply, whereas Damrosch focused on being able to identify pictures of composers, instruments, and the bare bones of symphonic themes. Adorno's criticism resulted in his dismissal from the Radio Research Project. Adorno contrasted what he considered a dead end (being able to whistle the theme of the Fifth Symphony) with the child who hears a string quartet in the next room and cannot sleep because the music holds his attention.

Adorno felt that Damrosch's musical pedagogy was a justification of class oppression, in which the conductor, without actually "working" at least in the sense that the musicians "work", is shown as "above" the mere musicians, none of whom can be said to play other than a part. Without claiming that the symphony orchestra was completely a product of capitalism (while pointing out that to be economically viable it had to find a place in exchange), Adorno saw the Radio Research Project and Damrosch as introducing, to children and working class adults, a justification of alienation and oppression.

Importation of French musicians
In April 1905 Damrosch went to France and Belgium looking for musicians for the New York Symphony Orchestra, which he directed from 1885 to 1928. He engaged five musicians: oboist Marcel Tabuteau, flutist Georges Barrère, bassoonist Auguste Mesnard, and clarinetist Leon Leroy from France, and trumpeter Adolphe Dubois from Belgium. Damrosch was fined by the musician's union for not advertising for musicians from New York, but the emigrating musicians were allowed to stay. In addition to achieving the intended effect of improving the quality of the New York Symphony Orchestra, Damrosch brought the United States five extremely fine musicians. Tabuteau was particularly influential. He served as principal oboist of the Philadelphia Orchestra from 1915 to 1954 under Leopold Stokowski and, just as importantly, taught in Philadelphia at the Curtis Institute of Music.

Laila Storch wrote, "During the thirty years during which Tabuteau taught at the Curtis Institute of Music, he came to exercise a decisive influence on the standards of oboe playing in the whole United States, as well as raising the level of woodwind achievement in general. Nor was the impact of his teaching confined to winds alone, as the many string players and pianists who attended his classes will testify." Barrère was well known as conductor of his own ensembles and as an influential teacher as well as for being the long-time principal flute player (1905–1928) in the New York Symphony Orchestra. Although perhaps less known, the other three Damrosch imports were important additions to the pool of New York musicians. Mesnard (from 1913 to 1928) and Leroy (from 1911 to 1914) were principal players in the New York Philharmonic after leaving the New York Symphony Orchestra. Nathaniel Shilkret's payrolls show Mesnard played in Shilkret's orchestras for more than thirty radio broadcasts.

Works
 The Scarlet Letter (1894) - opera in three acts based on Hawthorne's romance of that name; published by Breitkopf and Härtel
 The Manila Te Deum - for solos, chorus, and orchestra, written in honor of Dewey's victory at Manila Bay; published by the John Church Company
 Three songs, published by the John Church Company
 Sonata for violin and piano
 At Fox Meadow, published by the John Church Company
 Cyrano (1913) - a grand opera in four acts, libretto by W. J. Henderson, adapted from Rostand's play; published by G. Schirmer
 The Dove of Peace (1912) - comic opera/musical - composer and co-librettist with Wallace Irwin; published by G. Schirmer
 Electra (1918 revival) - play - incidental music composer
 My Musical Life (1922), Autobiography
 The Man Without a Country (1937)

Notes

References

External links

 
 

1862 births
1950 deaths
19th-century American composers
19th-century American male musicians
19th-century classical composers
20th-century American composers
20th-century classical composers
American male conductors (music)
American opera composers
American Romantic composers
American people of German-Jewish descent
Conductors of the Metropolitan Opera
German emigrants to the United States
Hochschule für Musik Carl Maria von Weber alumni
Male opera composers
Music directors of the New York Philharmonic
People from the Province of Silesia
20th-century American conductors (music)
20th-century American male musicians
Presidents of the American Academy of Arts and Letters